The Temco 58 was a low wing single engine, tandem seat propeller driven trainer designed for sale to overseas air forces. It did not reach production.

Design and development
Details of the Temco 58 were first released in January 1956. It was a development of the Model 33 Plebe, which had flown the previous year and competed unsuccessfully for a US Naval trainer contract.  The Model 58 seems to have used the same airframe (N848B) but with increased span and length, and was fitted with a more powerful Lycoming engine in place of the Plebe's Continental O-470.  The Model 58 was a private venture aimed at overseas air forces, capable of providing both basic and armaments training. Fully aerobatic and equipped for night flying, it was intended to be economical to buy and maintain.  It had many interchangeable parts to reduce spares stocks, could have major maintenance in the field and had sixteen access hatches for easy servicing.

The Temco 58 was an all-metal, low-cantilever-wing aircraft.  The tailplane was mounted on top of the fuselage and the fin and rudder were straight edged, with a small fillet. Tandem seats were enclosed with a power-driven single-piece canopy.  It had retractable tricycle gear, with a rearward-hinged nose leg. It was powered by a supercharged 340 hp (234 kW) Lycoming GSO-480-A1A flat-six engine.

Operational history
Only the prototype, registered N848B, is known to have flown.

Specifications

References

1950s United States military trainer aircraft
58
Low-wing aircraft
Aircraft first flown in 1956
Single-engined tractor aircraft